Interpretivism may refer to:

 Interpretivism (social science), an approach to social science that opposes the positivism of natural science
 Qualitative research, a method of inquiry in social science and related disciplines
 Interpretivism (legal), a school of thought in contemporary jurisprudence and the philosophy of law